Andrew Earl Jorgensen (born September 10, 1967) was a Democratic Party member of the Wisconsin State Assembly, representing the 43rd Assembly District from 2013 to 2017, previously representing the 37th from 2007 to 2013. He was a member of the Committees on Agriculture, Biofuels and Sustainable Energy, Consumer Protection and Personal Privacy, and Rural Affairs. As a result of redistricting, Mr. Jorgensen's district was divided, and on November 6, 2012, he defeated incumbent Evan Wynn to represent the 43rd Assembly District.

Jorgensen was born in Berlin, Wisconsin. He graduated from Omro High School in Omro, Wisconsin in 1986. He attended the Brown Institute, in 1987, to train for a career in radio broadcasting. He worked as a DJ and program host at WNBK in New London, then moved to WFAW, in Fort Atkinson. In 1995, he began working on the assembly line at General Motors’ Janesville plant, where he served as a shop steward for UAW Local 95.

He is also an active member of Trinity Lutheran Church, where he teaches Sunday school. He and his wife have three children.

References

External links
Wisconsin Assembly - Representative Andy Jorgensen official government website
Andy Jorgensen for State Assembly official campaign website
 
 Follow the Money - Andy Jorgensen
2008 2006 campaign contributions
Campaign 2008 campaign contributions at Wisconsin Democracy Campaign

1967 births
Living people
People from Berlin, Wisconsin
People from Fort Atkinson, Wisconsin
People from Omro, Wisconsin
Democratic Party members of the Wisconsin State Assembly
21st-century American politicians